Kim Min-Gu (Hangul: 김민구; born 6 June 1985) is a South Korean footballer who plays as midfielder for National Police Agency.

Kim was drafted in the 2007 K-League Draft by Incheon United. In 2009, he joined National Police Agency in the R-League for military duty.

References

External links 

1985 births
Living people
South Korean footballers
Incheon United FC players
Association football midfielders

ko:김민구 (축구 선수)